Les Lannom (born November 4, 1946) is an American actor and musician. Born in Johnston City, Illinois. He is perhaps best known for playing Lester Hodges in the American private detective television series Harry O from 1974 to 1976, and his role as Sergeant Casper in Southern Comfort.

Career 
Lannom appeared as a guest on the television series Judging Amy, The X Files, ER, NYPD Blue, The Larry Sanders Show, Columbo, Scarecrow and Mrs. King, CHiPs, Benson, Knots Landing, The Waltons (as Sweet Billy), The Streets of San Francisco, The Six Million Dollar Man, Cannon, and The Hardy Boys/Nancy Drew Mysteries. He played Larry Penzoss in the 1985 television miniseries Space and played Bufe Coker in the 1978 television miniseries Centennial. Both miniseries were based on James A. Michener novels. Lannom appeared in part V of the miniseries, "Roots, The Next Generations" as Jake, a gas station operator. He also appeared in the film Silkwood (1983). Lannom portrayed Sergeant Casper in Walter Hills Southern Comfort.

From 2002 to 2006, Lannom appeared onstage as Det. Brent Randall in Dark Legends in Blood. In 2007, he lent his considerable talent to the students of the Speech & Acting Team at his hometown high school Johnston City, Illinois, acting as a volunteer assistant coach. In April 2008, he returned to the high school stage as "Vince Fontaine" in Grease.

An accomplished musician, Lannom plays bagpipes, guitar, trumpet, harmonica, and is a singer. He is currently enjoying semi-retirement in his hometown of Johnston City, Illinois, playing the pipes and teaming up with music partner, Holly Kee, to create the unique sound of ROISIN DUBH. Les and Holly are also teaming up as Narrator and Executive Producer of audiobooks for the Benjamin Tucker Mystery Series by author Harry James Krebs. The pair has also begun a similar relationship with author Michael Phelps to produce audio versions for Phelps' two books about his friendship with David Janssen. Lannom and Janssen worked together on several episodes of Harry O, for which Lannom work on the television pilot of Harry O was liked by television director and producer, Jerry Thorpe.

Filmography

References

External links 
 
  Les Lannom(Aveleyman)

1946 births
Living people
American male film actors
American male stage actors
American male television actors
Musicians from Illinois
Place of birth missing (living people)
Male actors from Illinois
People from Carbondale, Illinois
People from Williamson County, Illinois
Southern Illinois University Carbondale alumni